Sidney Herbert, 14th Earl of Pembroke, 11th Earl of Montgomery,  (20 February 1853 – 30 March 1913), styled The Honourable Sidney Herbert between 1861 and 1895, was a British politician and peer.

Background and education

Herbert was born at 49 Belgrave Square, London, the second son of Sidney Herbert, 1st Baron Herbert of Lea (who was the son of George Augustus Herbert, 11th Earl of Pembroke, by his second wife Catherine Woronzow) and Mary Elizabeth, daughter of Lieutenant-General Charles Ashe à Court. George Herbert, 13th Earl of Pembroke, was his elder brother, and Sir Michael Henry Herbert his younger brother. Catherine Woronzow was the daughter of a prominent aristocratic Russian family, the Woronzows. He was educated at Eton and Christ Church, Oxford.

Political career
Herbert was elected as Member of Parliament for Wilton in Wiltshire in 1877 but lost his seat in the 1885 general election. This was somewhat of a shock given that the seat of the Earls of Pembroke was at Wilton House and his family dominated Wiltshire politics. Herbert was then chosen early in 1886 to replace William Grantham, who had just been appointed a judge, in Croydon. He was duly elected and served under Lord Salisbury as a Lord of the Treasury between 1886 and 1892. Although considered an able Member of Parliament, he was perhaps best known for his good looks and was widely regarded as the most handsome MP at the time.

Herbert succeeded his brother as Earl of Pembroke in 1895. He continued his political career in the House of Lords as Lord Steward of the Household under Salisbury and Arthur Balfour between 1895 and 1905. He was sworn of the Privy Council in 1895.

Lord Pembroke became President of the Marylebone Cricket Club for a year in 1896.

Family
Lord Pembroke married Lady Beatrix Louisa Lambton, daughter of George Lambton, 2nd Earl of Durham, on 29 August 1877. They had two sons and two daughters.

Lady Beatrix Frances Gertrude Herbert (1878-1957), married firstly Major Sir Nevile Rodwell Wilkinson (d. 22 December 1940) on 29 April 1903. Secondly, on 5 March 1942 she married Ralph Francis Forward-Howard, 7th Earl of Wicklow. She died childless.
Reginald Herbert, 15th Earl of Pembroke (1880-1960), married Lady Beatrice Eleanor Paget (1883-1973) on 21 January 1904. She was the paternal and maternal granddaughter of Henry Paget, 2nd Marquess of Anglesey, and Wellington Stapleton-Cotton, 2nd Viscount Combermere, respectively. They had four children.
Lady Muriel Katherine Herbert (1883-1951), married Dr. Arthur John Jex-Blake on 5 August 1920. They had one daughter.
Hon. Sir George Sidney Herbert (1886–1942), was created a Baronet in 1937. He never married.

Pembroke died in Rome, Italy, in March 1913, aged 60, and was succeeded in the earldom by his eldest son, Reginald. Lord Pembroke's brother-in-law Hubert Parry composed and premiered an Elegy for organ solo to commemorate the funeral, which took place on 7 April 1913.  Beatrix, Countess of Pembroke died in March 1944.

Honours
 : Knight Grand Cross of the Royal Victorian Order, 25 May 1896
 : Grand Cross of the Imperial Order of Leopold, 1903

References

External links 
 

1853 births
1913 deaths
Sidney Herbert, 14th Earl of Pembroke
Herbert, Sidney
Herbert, Sidney
People educated at Eton College
Alumni of Christ Church, Oxford
14
Conservative Party (UK) hereditary peers
Sidney
Members of the Privy Council of the United Kingdom
Knights Grand Cross of the Royal Victorian Order
British people of Russian descent
Younger sons of barons
People from Belgravia
UK MPs 1874–1880
UK MPs 1880–1885
UK MPs 1886–1892
UK MPs 1892–1895
UK MPs who inherited peerages
Presidents of the Marylebone Cricket Club